Gloria Tang Pui-yee (born 10 November 1992) is a Hong Kong Canadian actress and beauty pageant titleholder. She is the winner of Miss Chinese (Vancouver) Pageant 2012 and Miss Chinese International Pageant 2013.

Early life 
Born in Hong Kong, Gloria Tang immigrated to Richmond, British Columbia with her parents in 2000. She studied at UBC Sauder School of Business, and specialised in Marketing in the Business Faculty at the University of British Columbia.

Career

Pageant career 
At the age of 19, Tang competed in and won Miss Chinese Vancouver 2012. She went on to represent Vancouver at Miss Chinese International 2013 held at TVB City, Hong Kong. She won the title, becoming the sixth representative from Vancouver to win the Miss Chinese International title.

Acting career 
Tang joined Hong Kong broadcasting giant TVB after crowning her Miss Chinese International successor. She made her acting debut in the 2014 drama The Ultimate Addiction. Tang played ‘Ginnie Cheuk’, the younger sister of Bosco Wong’s character. She also co-hosted the television show Organized Dining until 2019.

Tang continued to play supporting roles in the next few years. In 2016, she played ‘Maple Chin’ in the drama Two Steps From Heaven, starring opposite Louis Cheung. Tang played the undercover agent ‘Kay Kwong’ in the 2019 crime drama The Defected, starring opposite veteran actor Philip Keung. With this role, Tang was nominated for the Best Supporting Actress at the 2019 TVB Anniversary Awards, eventually being placed among top 5.

In 2020, Tang had notable performance in the dramas Airport Strikers as the Airport Security Unit member ‘Silver Ho’ and The Exorcist’s 2nd Meter as the rich exorcist ‘Liz Sze’. With her performance in 2020, Tang was placed among the top 5 nominees for the Most Improved Female Artiste at the 2020 TVB Anniversary Awards.

In July 2020, Tang was cast in her first female leading role for the time-travelling drama Take Two. The drama was broadcast in October 2021. With her role as ‘Hailey Cheung’, Tang gained her first Best Actress nomination at the 2021 TVB Anniversary Awards.

Filmography

Television dramas (TVB)

Awards and nominations

References 

Hong Kong actresses
Hong Kong television actresses
Naturalized citizens of Canada
21st-century Hong Kong actresses
1992 births
Living people
People from Richmond, British Columbia
University of British Columbia alumni